Muntean is a Romanian language surname.  (Romanian pronunciation: [munˈte̯an]). When transliterated from Russian, in may be spelled as Muntyan.  
It is commonly found in Romania and Moldova and literally translates as "highlander".

Notable people with the name include:

Andrei Muntean (born 1993), Romanian artistic gymnast
Christian Muntean (born 1974), American author
Iurie Muntean (born 1972), Moldovan politician
Markus Muntean (born 1962), Austrian artist
Paul Muntean (born 1984), Romanian bobsledder
Petru Muntean, Moldovan politician

Ion Muntean (born 1962), Moldovan politician
Radu Muntean (born 1971), Romanian film director and screenwriter
Victoria Muntean (born 1997), French tennis player
Vladimir Muntyan, Soviet footballer

See also
Munteanu

Romanian-language surnames